This was the first edition of the tournament.

Shuko Aoyama and Yang Zhaoxuan won the title, defeating Viktorija Golubic and Lyudmyla Kichenok in the final 6–7(7–9), 6–3, [10–8].

Seeds

Draw

References
Main Draw

Aegon Southsea Trophy - Doubles
Southsea Trophy